Adrift may refer to:

Media
 Adrift (band), a Tampa, Florida-based American heavy rock band
 Adrift (video game), a first-person adventure video game
 "Adrift", a song by God Is an Astronaut from the album Ghost Tapes #10

Film
 Adrift (1911 film), a 1911 American silent short drama film
 Adrift (2009 Brazilian film), a 2009 Brazilian drama film directed by Heitor Dhalia
 Adrift (2009 Vietnamese film), a 2009 Vietnamese film directed by Bui Thac Chuyen
 Adrift (2018 film), an American romantic drama film
 Open Water 2: Adrift, a 2006 psychological horror film

Literature
 Adrift, a 1980 memoir by Tristan Jones
 Adrift: Seventy-six Days Lost at Sea, a 1986 memoir by Steven Callahan
 Adrift: America in 100 Charts, a 2020 book by Scott Galloway

Television
 Adrift, a 1993 television film starring Kate Jackson 
 "Adrift" (Lost), the second episode of the second season of Lost
 "Adrift" (Stargate Atlantis), the 61st episode of the science fiction television series Stargate Atlantis
 "Adrift" (Torchwood), the eleventh episode of the second series of British science fiction television series Torchwood
 "Adrift", a 2020 episode of the animated series 12 oz. Mouse
 "Adrift" (The Lord of the Rings: The Rings of Power), an episode of the first season of The Lord of the Rings: The Rings of Power

Other
 ADRIFT, a graphical user interface used to create and play text adventures
 Adrift, a ship direction meaning floating in the water without propulsion